California's 50th State Assembly district is one of 80 California State Assembly districts. It is currently represented by Democrat Richard Bloom of Santa Monica.

District profile 
The district encompasses the area between the Pacific Ocean and the Santa Monica Mountains, along with a large section of Central Los Angeles. The district is heavily white and includes the Malibu shoreline and much of Hollywood.

Los Angeles County – 4.8%
 Agoura Hills
 Beverly Hills
 Los Angeles – 6.9%
 Bel Air
 Brentwood
 Hollywood – partial
 Mid-Wilshire – partial
 Pacific Palisades
 Malibu
 Santa Monica
 Topanga
 West Hollywood

Election results from statewide races

List of Assembly Members 
Due to redistricting, the 50th district has been moved around different parts of the state. The current iteration resulted from the 2011 redistricting by the California Citizens Redistricting Commission.

Election results 1992 - present

2020

2018

2016

2014

2012

2010

2008

2006

2004

2002

2000

1998

1996

1994

1992

See also 
 California State Assembly
 California State Assembly districts
 Districts in California

References

External links 
 District map from the California Citizens Redistricting Commission

50
Government of Los Angeles County, California
Agoura Hills, California 
Bel Air, Los Angeles
Beverly Hills, California
Brentwood, Los Angeles
Fairfax, Los Angeles
Hollywood, Los Angeles
Hollywood Hills
Malibu, California
Mid-Wilshire, Los Angeles
Pacific Palisades, Los Angeles
Santa Monica, California
Santa Monica Mountains
Topanga, California
West Hollywood, California
Westside (Los Angeles County)